Hyvät, pahat ja rumat (English: The Good, the Bad and the Ugly) was a popular 1990s Finnish comedy chat show presented on MTV3.

References

1992 Finnish television series debuts
1997 Finnish television series endings
MTV3 original programming
Finnish television shows